Darreh Ahvazi (also Romanized as Darreh Ahvāzī; also known as Darreh Ahvāz) is a village in Rud Zard Rural District, in the Central District of Bagh-e Malek County, Khuzestan Province, Iran. At the 2006 census, its population was 39, in 9 families.

References 

Populated places in Bagh-e Malek County